Ádám Szudi (born 29 January 1996) is a Hungarian table tennis player. He competed in the 2020 Summer Olympics.

References

External links
 

1996 births
Living people
People from Szolnok
Table tennis players at the 2020 Summer Olympics
Hungarian male table tennis players
Olympic table tennis players of Hungary
Table tennis players at the 2014 Summer Youth Olympics
Sportspeople from Jász-Nagykun-Szolnok County
21st-century Hungarian people